Flawinne is a village of Wallonia and a district of the municipality of Namur, located in the province of Namur, Belgium. 

It was formerly a municipality itself until the fusion of Belgian municipalities in 1977.

History 
At 2 August 1897, Flawinne left Belgrade municipality to become an independent one. It was merged with Namur in 1977.

See also
Château de Flawinne
2nd Commando Battalion

External links
 

Sub-municipalities of Namur (city)
Former municipalities of Namur (province)